Money Creek is an unincorporated community in Houston County, Minnesota, United States.

History
Money Creek was platted in 1856 by the name of Clinton. The community took its name from nearby Money Creek. A post office was established at Money Creek in 1856, and remained in operation until 1907.

Notes

Unincorporated communities in Houston County, Minnesota
Unincorporated communities in Minnesota